Hūsker Dū? is a memory game that can be played by children and adults, published in the United States in the 1950s. The game is currently published in the USA by Winning Moves Games USA.

Game play
The game board consists of a surface with holes in it, laid on top of a dial that contains several sets of small pictures. The holes are covered by markers at the start of the game, and the dial is rotated to line up one set of positions with the holes. On each turn, a player removes two markers to reveal the pictures underneath. If they do not match, the player replaces the markers and their turn ends. If the pictures do match, the player keeps the two markers and takes another turn. Once the board is cleared, the player holding the most markers is the winner.

Marketing
The American version of the board game was first distributed in the 1950s by the Pressman Toy Corporation. The boxed game proclaimed itself one "in which the child can outwit the adult."

A notorious advertisement for the game that aired during the 1973 Christmas season featured subliminal cuts, with the phrase "Get It."  Even though subliminal messages are commonly believed to be ineffective, the FCC received complaints about the ad and issued a public notice calling subliminal advertising "deceptive and contrary to the public interest." The Premium Corporation of America voluntarily removed the commercial from the air, claiming that the subliminal message was inserted by a misguided employee.

Another early ad featured a voiceover by professional-wrestling announcer "Mean Gene" Okerlund.

See also
Hüsker Dü - band whose name is derived from the game.

Notes

References

External links

Board games introduced in the 1950s
Children's board games
Pressman Toy Corporation games